The Western Whirlwind is a 1927 American silent Western film directed by Albert S. Rogell and written by Harrison Jacobs. The film stars Jack Hoxie, Margaret Quimby, Claude Payton, Billy Engle, Edith Murgatroyd and Jack Pratt. The film was released on February 20, 1927, by Universal Pictures.

Cast     
 Jack Hoxie as Jack Howard
 Margaret Quimby as Molly Turner
 Claude Payton as Jeff Taylor
 Billy Engle as 'Beans' Baker
 Edith Murgatroyd as Mrs. Martha Howard 
 Jack Pratt as Jim Blake

References

External links
 

1927 films
1920s English-language films
1927 Western (genre) films
Universal Pictures films
Films directed by Albert S. Rogell
American black-and-white films
Silent American Western (genre) films
1920s American films